Nagudi  is a village in the Aranthangirevenue block of Pudukkottai district, Tamil Nadu, India.

Demographics 

As per the 2001 census, Nagudi had a total population of 430 with 211 males and 219 females. Out of the total population 254 people were literate.

References

Villages in Pudukkottai district